Occoneechee State Park is a state park near Clarksville, Virginia, located along Buggs Island Lake.  Occoneechee State Park is 2,698 acres in size. It is named for the Occaneechi Indians, who lived in the area. "Bacon's Rebellion abruptly ended their prominence in 1676. This armed rebellion is considered to be the first to occur in the New World. It began when Nathaniel Bacon’s plantation was raided by Susquehannock Indians, who had been displaced from their home to the north. Bacon asked Virginia Gov. Berkley to raise a militia and retaliate. Berkley denied the request so Bacon raised a militia, in violation of the governor’s wishes."

References
Park website
Friends of Occoneechee State Park

State parks of Virginia
Parks in Halifax County, Virginia
Parks in Mecklenburg County, Virginia
Native American museums in Virginia
Museums in Mecklenburg County, Virginia
Protected areas established in 1968
1968 establishments in Virginia